Radhika Nair is an Indian fashion model. Radhika was the first Indian model & the first to walk for Demna Gvasalia Balenciaga SS17 show in Paris.

Radhika was studying commerce in Bangalore when she was scouted to become a model in 2012. She moved from Bangalore to Mumbai to pursue modelling as a full-time career. In 2016 the casting director Henry Mackintosh Thomas came to Delhi, India. It was in Delhi through stylist friend Nikhil D that Radhika met Henry and was cast exclusively for the Balenciaga SS17 show.

She has appeared in campaigns for Chloé shot by Steven Meisel, Versus Versace, H&M X Erderm & Net-a-Porter. Radhika has been featured in magazines Vogue (Ukraine), Vogue (Germany), Vogue (Russia), W Magazine, Harpers Bazaar US, Harpers Bazaar UK, Harpers Bazaar (India), Dazed, Numéro China, CR Fashion Book, Unconditional Magazine & Elle (India).

An accomplished catwalker, Radhika has walked for Anna Sui, Balenciaga (Exclusive), Belstaff, Chloé, Chalayan, Erderm, Emilio Pucci, Etro, Esteban Cortazar (opened), Loewe, Lacoste, Miu Miu, Marc Jacobs, MSGM, Mulberry, Marco De Vincenzo, Paul Smith, Prabal Gurung, Pringle of Scotland, J.W Anderson, Jil Sander, Redemption Couture, Ronald van der Kemp Couture, Sportmax, Sies Marjan,  Trussadi, Vetements, Valentin Yudashkin, Vionett & Zimmerman.

Early life 
Radhika Nair was born Malayali in Kerala, but she was raised in Jharkhand. An avid amateur photographer inspired by Pieter Hugo and Martin Parr, her work has been published in W Magazine & Vogue. Radhika Nair is also an Indian classically trained singer of the Rajas.

References 

Living people
Female models from Kerala
1991 births
People from Kerala
Indian female models
Ford Models models